The Ebers Papyrus, also known as Papyrus Ebers, is an Egyptian medical papyrus of herbal knowledge dating to  (the late Second Intermediate Period or early New Kingdom). Among the oldest and most important medical papyri of Ancient Egypt, it was purchased at Luxor in the winter of 1873–1874 by the German Egyptologist Georg Ebers. It is currently kept at the Leipzig University Library in Germany.

Manuscript
The Ebers Papyrus is a 110-page scroll, which is about 20 meters long.

Along with the Kahun Gynaecological Papyrus, the Edwin Smith Papyrus, the Hearst papyrus, the Brugsch Papyrus, and the London Medical Papyrus, the Ebers Papyrus is among the oldest preserved medical documents. The Brugsch and the London Medical papyri share some of the same information as the Ebers Papyrus.

Another document, the Carlsberg papyrus, is identical to the Ebers Papyrus, though the provenance of the former is unknown.

Medical knowledge

The Ebers Papyrus is written in hieratic Egyptian writing and represents the most extensive and best-preserved record of ancient Egyptian medicine known.

The scroll contains some 700 magical formulas and folk remedies.  It contains many incantations meant to turn away disease-causing demons and there is also evidence of a long tradition of empiricism.

The papyrus contains a "treatise on the heart".  It notes that the heart is the centre of the blood supply, with vessels attached for every member of the body.

The ancient Egyptians seem to have known little about the kidneys and made the heart the meeting point of a number of vessels which carried all the fluids of the body—blood, tears, urine and semen.

Mental disorders are detailed in a chapter of the papyrus called the Book of Hearts. Disorders such as depression and dementia are covered. The descriptions of these disorders suggest that Egyptians conceived of mental and physical diseases in much the same way.

The papyrus contains chapters on contraception, diagnosis of pregnancy and other gynecological matters, intestinal disease and parasites, eye and skin problems, dentistry, the surgical treatment of abscesses and tumors, bone-setting, and burns.

The "channel theory" was prevalent at the time of writing of the Ebers papyrus; it suggested that unimpeded flow of bodily fluids is a prerequisite for good health.

The Ebers papyrus may be considered a precursor of ancient Greek humeral pathology and the subsequently established theory of humorism, providing a historical connection between ancient Egypt, ancient Greece, and medieval medicine.

Examples of medical remedies
Examples of remedies in the Ebers Papyrus include:
Birth control: "To prevent conception, smear a paste of dates, acacia, and honey to wool and apply as a pessary."
Diabetes mellitus: "Drink a mixture including elderberry, asit plant fibres, milk, beer-swill, cucumber flowers, and green dates." It is not known what "asit" is.
Guinea-worm disease: "Wrap the emerging end of the worm around a stick and slowly pull it out." 3,500 years later, this remains the standard treatment.

Medicinal use of ochre clays
One of the more common remedies described in the papyrus is ochre, or medicinal clay.  It is prescribed for intestinal and eye complaints. Yellow ochre is also described as a remedy for urological complaints.

Insect repellents
The use of insect repellents derived from plants and other organisms found in nature is known from the time of the Ebers Papyrus.  Several examples of such repellents can be found in the text.

Calendar
In the time of Amenhotep I a calendar table was written on the verso side of the papyrus. Since 1906 we have a transcript by Kurt Sethe. Some rate this table to be "the most valuable chronological tool from Egypt that we are ever likely to possess". (Tetley 2014)

Modern history of the papyrus
Like the Edwin Smith Papyrus, the Ebers Papyrus came into the possession of Edwin Smith in 1862.

The source of the papyrus is unknown, but it was said to have been found between the legs of a mummy in the El-Assasif district of the Theban necropolis.

The papyrus remained in the collection of Edwin Smith until at least 1869, when there appeared—in the catalog of an antiquities dealer—an advertisement for "a large medical papyrus in the possession of Edwin Smith, an American farmer of Luxor."

The papyrus was purchased in 1872 by the German Egyptologist and novelist, Georg Ebers, after whom it is named.

Translations
In 1875, Ebers published a facsimile with an English-Latin vocabulary and introduction.  It was not until 1890, however, that it was translated by H. Joachim.  Ebers retired from his chair of Egyptology at Leipzig on a pension and the papyrus remained in the University of Leipzig library.  An English translation of the papyrus was published by Paul Ghalioungui.  The papyrus was published and translated by different researchers.

See also
 List of ancient Egyptian papyri
 History of medicine
 Medical literature

References

Further reading
 
 
 
 
 
 
 Ghalioungui, Paul; The Ebers Papyrus: A New English Translation, Commentaries and Glossaries by Paul Ghalioungui; 1987 edition.

External links
 
 
 

Ancient Egyptian medical works
Egyptian papyri
Medicinal clay